Le-myet-hna ( le:myak-hna bhu.ra:,  Leìmyeʔhna hpăyà) is a Buddhist temple in Mrauk U located at the northwest corner of the Shite-thaung Temple. It has four entrances, one to each cardinal point and eight seated Buddhas round a central column. It was built by King Min Saw Mon in 1430 AD. Temple was entirely constructed with black sand stones.

See also 
 Shite-thaung Temple
 Htukkanthein Temple
 Koe-thaung Temple
 Andaw-thein Ordination Hall
 Ratanabon Pagoda 
 List of Buddhist temples in Myanmar
 Min Saw Mon

References

Bibliography
 

Buddhist temples in Rakhine State

History of Myanmar
Pagodas in Myanmar
15th-century Buddhist temples
Religious buildings and structures completed in 1430